Monkeybird, monkey-bird or monkey bird may refer to:

Various birds which are attracted to feeding monkeys:
White-crested hornbill (Tropicanus albocristatus)
Yellow-billed malkoha (Phaenicophaeus calyorhynchus)
Greater racket-tailed drongo (Dicrurus paradiseus)
Monkey bird, a fictional creature in the animated fantasy series The Pirates of Dark Water
"Monkeybird", a song on the album The Story of Harmelodia by Rheostatics
The Pink Monkey Birds, backing band for American guitarist Kid Congo Powers
Slang term for the receiving partner in male-on-male anal sex, included in the lyrics to "Moonage Daydream" by David Bowie

Animal common name disambiguation pages